The Caroline Islands (or the Carolines) are a widely scattered archipelago of tiny islands in the western Pacific Ocean, to the north of New Guinea. Politically, they are divided between the Federated States of Micronesia (FSM) in the central and eastern parts of the group, and Palau at the extreme western end. Historically, this area was also called Nuevas Filipinas or New Philippines, because they were part of the Spanish East Indies and were governed from Manila in the Philippines.

The Carolines are scattered across a distance of approximately 3,540 kilometers (2,200 miles), from the westernmost island, Tobi, in Palau, to the easternmost island, Kosrae, a state of the FSM.

Description
The group consists of about 500 small coral islands, east of the Philippines, in the Pacific Ocean.

Most of the islands are made up of low, flat coral atolls, but there are some that rise high above sea level.

People and culture

The indigenous inhabitants speak a variety of languages, including: the Micronesian languages of Pohnpeian, Chuukese, Carolinian, and Kosraean; the Western Malayo-Polynesian languages of Palauan and Chamorro; and the unclassified language Yapese (possibly one of the Admiralty Islands languages). There are also a significant number of inhabitants who belong to non-indigenous ethnic groups and speak other languages, including Filipinos and Japanese. The lingua franca used for trade and commerce among islanders who do not speak each other's languages is English.

The indigenous people of these islands live mainly on horticultural products, fish, many different varieties of bananas, and taro (either the "swamp" or the "purple" kind). On some islands, housing is still built using local materials such as coconut-palm thatch. As a result of missionary work over the centuries, Christianity is the religion most commonly practiced in this region of Micronesia. Nevertheless, many of the indigenous people adhere to the traditional belief in a supreme being called "Yalafar" and an evil spirit called "Can." For the most part, however, they do not engage in traditional religious rites.

The inhabitants of Yap are noted for possessing an unusual currency. Besides the ordinary shell money, there is a sort of stone coinage, consisting of huge calcite or limestone discs or wheels from 6 inches to 12 feet. in diameter, and weighing up to nearly 5 tons. These are all quarried in the Pelew Islands, 200 miles to the south, and must have been brought by native vessels or on rafts; later they were transferred on European vessels. The stones, which are rather tokens than money, do not circulate, but are piled up round about the chief's treasure-house, and appear to be regarded as public property. Some may not have been seen for some years, but the transfer of wealth is facilitated by a common understanding that a stone has a new owner.

The Micronesian navigator Mau Piailug (1932-2010) was originally from the Carolinian island of Satawal. He learned the traditional navigation techniques of the Weriyeng school, which had been preserved after other traditional techniques had been forgotten (due partly to the remoteness of the Carolinian Islands). In the 1970s, Mau shared his knowledge with members of the Polynesian Voyaging Society. This led to a revival of the practices of traditional Polynesian navigation techniques, and provided anthropologists with a greater understanding of the history of the Polynesian and Micronesian peoples.

In 1985, a study was published that examined the origin of the sidereal compass used in the Caroline Islands.

History

Different islands in the Carolines have passed down different legends about the origins and early histories of their peoples. For example, on Pohnpei, the islanders describe their history before colonial times as divided into three eras: the Mwehin Kawa or Mwehin Aramas (era of building or peopling, before 1100); the Mwehin Sau Deleur (era of the reigns of the Saudeleur, from 1100 to around 1628); and the Mwehin Nahnmwarki (era of the tribal chiefs, from around 1628 to 1885, when Spain colonized the islands). 

According to Pohnpeian legend: the Saudeleur rulers originally came from beyond the islands; they were the first to bring government to Pohnpei; they imposed absolute, centralized rule on the islanders, which became increasingly oppressive over the centuries; and their arbitrary and onerous demands, along with their offenses against Pohnpeian deities, sowed resentment among Pohnpeians. Legend has it that the Saudeleur dynasty ended when another foreigner, called Isokelekel, invaded the islands, overthrew the Saudeleurs, and instituted the more decentralized nahnmwarki (tribal chief) system (which was maintained even during the later Colonial period, and still exists today).

Spanish overseas province 

The first contact that European explorers had with the Caroline islands was in 1525, when a summer storm carried the Portuguese navigators Diogo da Rocha and Gomes de Sequeira eastward from the Moluccas (by way of Celebes). They ended up reaching several of the Caroline islands and staying there for several months, until January 20, 1526. Soon after, on August 22, 1526, the Spanish explorers Toribio Alonso de Salazar and Diego de Saavedra arrived in the area and recorded sighting the Island of San Bartolomé (Taongui). About 8 months later, on 1 January 1528, the explorer Álvaro de Saavedra Cerón claimed possession of the Ulithi Islands on behalf of the king of Spain. He named them the Islands of the Kings after his patron and the Three Wise Men honored in the approaching Catholic feast of Epiphany. Spanish explorers visited the archipelago again in 1542 (Matelotes Islands), 1543, and 1545. In 1565, the islands were briefly visited by the first governor-general of the Philippines, Miguel Lopez de Legazpi (in office from 1565 to 1572).

Europeans did not visit the island again until 1686, when Francisco de Lezcano arrived in Yap. He called the islands Las Carolinas, in honor of Charles II of Spain. This name was later extended to include the Palau Islands and the archipelagos that British explorers, visiting them a century later (between 1788 and 1799), would come to call the Gilbert Islands and the Marshall Islands (Spaniards today call the Caroline islands Islas de las Hermanas, Hombres Pintados, and Los Jardines).

A Spanish royal decree, issued on October 19, 1707, authorized Spanish missionaries to make several expeditions to the Caroline Islands. However, in 1731, one such missionary, Juan Antonio Cantova, was killed. As a result, Spain ceased relations with the Caroline Islands. When they resumed relations in 1787, their emphasis was on trade and commerce.

In 1852, a Spanish colonel named Coello suggested to the Spanish government that effective Spanish occupation of the Caroline Islands would help the Spanish engage in trade and commerce with the Philippines, Australia, New Guinea, and the Americas. His suggestion was ignored at first, but, in 1885, a Spanish government representative called Butron signed an agreement with the tribal chiefs of Koror and Artingal establishing Spanish sovereignty over the Caroline Islands. At that point, Spain attempted to impose customs duties on commercial exchanges in the region. However, Spain's previous abandonment of the islands had allowed the establishment of German and British missions on the islands, and Germany and the United Kingdom disputed Spain's right to collect customs revenue. The European powers called on Pope Leo XIII to arbitrate this dispute. He decided that Spain would have these rights on the islands west of the 164th meridian east, and Germany would have these rights on the Marshall Islands. (He also assigned Germany the right to maintain a naval station in one of the Caroline Islands, but Germany never exercised that right.)

After the Spanish–American War of 1898, Spain sold the Carolines and the Northern Marianas to German Empire in the German–Spanish Treaty (1899) for 25 million pesetas (the equivalent of 17 million goldmarks or nearly one million pounds sterling), while reserving to itself the right to establish a coal mine in the area. Germany governed the archipelago as the Karolinen, and administratively associated it with German New Guinea.

A resort for whalers
The islands were a popular resort for whaling ships in the 19th century. The first such vessel known to have visited was the London whaler Britannia, which called at Ngatik in December 1793. Such vessels—from Britain, the United States, Australia and elsewhere—came for water, wood, and food and, sometimes, for men willing to serve as crewmen on the vessels. These ships stimulated commerce and were significant vectors for change (both good and ill). The islands most commonly visited were Kosrae, Mokil, Ngatik, Pingelap and Pohnpei.

Japanese colony
Japan invaded and occupied the islands in 1914 during World War I, installing two naval squadrons. The Western Carolines were under the squadron commanded by Rear Admiral Matsumura Tatsuo (1868–1932); the Eastern Carolines were under Vice-Admiral Yamaya Tanin (1866–1940). In 1920, after World War I, Japan received a League of Nations mandate to control the Caroline and Marshall Islands. During World War II, Japan operated a large base at Truk Lagoon which it used for expansion into the southeastern Pacific. In the latter years of that war, during the Japanese withdrawal to the Japanese home islands, the Allies effectively neutralized Truk in Operation Hailstone. After the war, the islands (together with the Marshall Islands) became trust territories of the United States. The Federated States of Micronesia gained independence in 1986, followed by Palau in 1994.

Colonial governors or officers

District officers (from 1889, styled Bezirksamtleute):

In the Western Caroline islands (Yap and Palau [and from 1907 Saipan])
29 June 1886 – 18??, Manuel de Elisa
before November 1897 – after November 1898, S. Cortes
1899–1909, Arno Senfft (b. 1864 – d. 1909)
1909–19??, Rudolf Karlowa
1909–1910, Georg Fritz
1910–1911, Hermann Kersting
1911–1914, Baumert

In the Eastern Caroline islands (Ponape, and including the Marshall Islands from 1911)
June 1886 – 1887, Capriles
14 March 1887 – 1887, Isidro Posadillo (d. 1887)
October 1887 – January 1891, Luis Cadarso y Rey (d. 1898)
c.1894, Concha
before November 1897 – after November 1898, J. Fernández de Córdoba
12 October 1899 – August 1901, Albert Hahl (b. 1868 – d. 1945)
1 September 1901 – 30 April 1907, Victor Berg (b. 1861 – d. 1907)
1907–198?, Max Girschner (acting)
1908–1909, Georg Fritz
1909 – 18 October 1910, Gustav Boeder (d. 1910)
1910 – 7 October 1914, August Überhorst

Ecclesiastical history
Two Jesuits, Juan Antonio Cantova (also known as John Anthony Cantova) and Victor Walter, attempted missionary work there in 1731; the former was soon murdered and the latter obliged to flee. Two other Jesuits were killed later. In 1767, the Jesuits were suppressed in the Spanish dominions, and for the next 120 years there was no trace of a missionary in the islands.

After the 1886 dispute between Germany and Spain over possession of the Carolines was settled by Pope Leo XIII in favour of Spain, the king of Spain directed Spanish Capuchins to go to the islands. The royal order was issued on 15 March 1886, and the Propaganda Fide officially established that mission on 15 May 1886, dividing it into two sections, named the West Caroline's and the East Carolines. Until that time, the islands had belonged ecclesiastically to the Vicariate Apostolic of Micronesia. The Spanish Capuchins caused a catechism and prayer book to be printed in the Ponape language, and Father Anthony of Valentia wrote a small grammar and dictionary of the Yap language in 1890.

In 1899, after the Spanish priests had laid the foundations of the mission, the islands passed by purchase into the hands of Germany. Spain had contributed more than $5000 a year towards the mission, but Germany contributed no support. Spain had compelled the indigenous people to send their children to school; Germany allowed people to choose to send their children or not. As a result, many people stopped attending church and sending their children to school, and the mission's fortunes suffered. In response, the Propaganda Fide decided on 7 November 1904 to replace the Spanish Capuchins with German missionaries, and on 18 December 1905 to erect a single Apostolic prefecture in place of the two separate missions. The Very Reverend Father Venantius of Prechtal, Germany, was appointed first prefect Apostolic at that time.

In 1906, 24 missionaries (12 Fathers and 12 Brothers) were working in thirteen stations, and several Sisters of St. Francis left Luxembourg to take charge of the ten primary schools, in which a total of 262 children were enrolled. The missionaries boasted 90 adult converts that year, and reported that there were 1900 Catholics, a few Protestants, and 11,600 inhabitants who had not converted to Christianity.

On 1 July 1905, the United States sent a Jesuit from the Manila Observatory to the island of Yap to erect a meteorological station there, and appointed the Capuchin Father Callistus as its director. The station was able to identify that the East-Asiatic typhoons were originating in the Carolines. The station still makes weather observations twice a day, and sends advance notice of severe weather to Manila.

Postage stamps

During the period of German control, Germany issued postage stamps for the islands.

Transportation

Transportation within the islands is either by boat or air (if in close proximity of an airfield).
Air travel is mostly domestic as most facilities cannot handle large aircraft. Caroline Islands Air is a chartered and the only domestic airline.

Flora
Three of the four species in the genus Ponapea are endemic to the Caroline Islands.

See also
Wa (watercraft)

Notes

References

External links

Expedition to Kapingamarangi & Nukuoro (1979) Fathom magazine

 
Archipelagoes of Oceania
Archipelagoes of the Pacific Ocean
Geography of Micronesia
Divided regions
Landforms of Palau
Landforms of the Federated States of Micronesia
Former colonies in Oceania
Former German colonies
Former Japanese colonies
Former Spanish colonies
German New Guinea
South Seas Mandate
Spanish East Indies
Purchased territories